Antonio Cagnoli (29 September 1743, in Zakynthos – 6 August 1816, in Verona) was an Italian astronomer, mathematician and diplomat in the service of the Republic of Venice. His father Ottavio was chancellor to the Venetian governor of the Ionian Islands.

External links

18th-century Italian astronomers
Italian diplomats
Republic of Venice scientists
Italian mathematicians
1743 births
1816 deaths